Bellorchestia is a genus of amphipods of the family Talitridae, containing the following species:
Bellorchestia chathamensis (Hurley, 1956)
Bellorchestia kirki (Hurley, 1956)
Bellorchestia marmorata (Haswell, 1880)
Bellorchestia pravidactyla (Haswell, 1880)
Bellorchestia quoyana (Milne-Edwards, 1840)
Bellorchestia richardsoni Serejo & Lowry, 2008
Bellorchestia spadix (Hurley, 1956)
Bellorchestia tumida (Thomson, 1885)

References

Gammaridea